Aurelio Vidmar (born 3 February 1967) is an Australian  association football manager and former player, who was most recently the manager of Thai League 1 club Bangkok United. 

He is a former captain of the Australia national team and former coach of the Australia U23 national team. 

In recognition of decorated national team career, and his service to Adelaide United, the southern end of Hindmarsh Stadium is named the Vidmar End.

His brother Tony Vidmar is also a former footballer.

Club career
Vidmar started his professional career with local Adelaide team Adelaide City before moving to Europe in the mid-1990s to Belgium, where he was the league's top scorer in the 1994–95 season.  He also played in Spain, Switzerland, the Netherlands and in Japan before returning to Australia in 1999 to rejoin City. Vidmar signed with Adelaide United when they took Adelaide City's spot in the National Soccer League and was awarded the captaincy by then coach John Kosmina. Despite plans to play in the inaugural A-League season he retired in 2005 bringing an end to a 20-year playing career in which time he played 517 games scoring 127 goals.

International career
Vidmar was a member of the Australia national team for 12 years and was a member of three unsuccessful FIFA World Cup qualification campaigns. He played and scored against Diego Maradona's Argentina in Australia's final qualifying ties in 1993, he played at the Melbourne Cricket Ground against Iran in 1997 when a 2–0 lead slipped from Australia's grasp. He also played in the match between Australia and American Samoa in 2001 and scored twice. Vidmar sometimes captained the Socceroos between 1995 and 2001 when he retired for international competition accumulating 44 caps and scoring 17 goals.

He was also selected as overage player on the Australia Olympic soccer team at the 1996 Summer Olympics.

Managerial career
After his retirement in 2005 he took up a role of assistant coach working under Kosmina, he was appointed as head coach on 2 May 2007. The 2007–08 A-League season was not very successful for Aurelio Vidmar, his side finishing 6th out of 8 teams on the ladder the first time Adelaide failed to make the finals. Calls for his resignation were being made and his unsuccessful Asian Champions League campaign, albeit against talented opposition, only fuelled these accusations, coming 3rd in his group with only the winner progressing to the quarter finals.

Vidmar began to regain the support of the United supporters by securing valuable acquisitions such as Cristiano and Sasa Ognenovski and built up Adelaide's defence and improved their attacking options. He created history by leading Adelaide to the 2008 AFC Champions League Final, becoming the first Australian team to achieve such a feat. This led Adelaide United CEO Sam Ciccarello to re-sign Vidmar and his assistant Phil Stubbins for another three years in November 2008.

Vidmar was inducted into the Football Federation Australia Football Hall of Fame in the same month. He is also in the Football Federation of South Australia Hall of Champions. He made a controversial diatribe after the semi-final against Melbourne Victory, in which Adelaide lost 4–0, and 6–0 on aggregate. Post-match, he claimed that Adelaide was a "piss-ant town", and that politics within the club was to blame for the loss. He later apologised for his remarks.

However, with the start of the new season, Vidmar was unable to retain the form from the previous season with a slow start by taking only five of the 15 available points. He has been criticised for his use of playing a lone striker. Adelaide finished last in the 2009–10 season. As a result of comments he made at a media conference in November 2009 about "beheading his players like they would do in Saudi Arabia" if they did not perform well, Adelaide United handed Vidmar a two-match touchline ban. The club also issued Vidmar a $10,000 fine. After leaving Adelaide United, Vidmar became the coach of the Young Socceroos. Vidmar was the caretaker coach of the Socceroos team for one match in 2013, after Holger Osieck's contract was terminated.

He was appointed in 2018 as Director of Football for Adelaide United FC. After five months, the club announced on 6 February 2019, that Vidmar had resigned from his role.

In 2022, Vidmar has been named as coach of Bangkok United, the struggling Thai League 1 side. On 28 December 2022, Vidmar resigned his post for personal reasons.

Personal life
Vidmar is the brother of Tony Vidmar, who is also a former footballer.

Career statistics

Club

International

Managerial statistics

 Results from penalty shoot-outs are counted as draws in this table.

Honours

Player
Adelaide City
 NSL Championship: 1986

FC Sion
Swiss Cup: 1995–96

Australia
 FIFA Confederations Cup: runner-up 1997
 OFC Nations Cup: 2000

Manager
BG Pathum United
 Thailand Champions Cup: 2021

Individual
 Belgian League top scorer: 1994–95 (22 goals)
 Oceania Footballer of the Year: 1994
 Football Federation of South Australia Hall of Champions: 2008
 Football Federation Australia Hall of Fame: 2008
 A-League Coach of the Year: 2008–09
 South Australia Sports Hall of Fame 2019
Thai League 1 Coach of the Month: August 2022

References

External links

 
 
 
 Adelaide United profile

1967 births
Living people
Australian soccer players
Australian soccer coaches
Adelaide City FC players
K.V. Kortrijk players
Standard Liège players
Feyenoord players
FC Sion players
CD Tenerife players
Sanfrecce Hiroshima players
Adelaide United FC players
Croydon Kings players
Belgian Pro League players
Eredivisie players
La Liga players
J1 League players
Australia international soccer players
Australian expatriate soccer coaches
Olympic soccer players of Australia
Footballers at the 1996 Summer Olympics
1997 FIFA Confederations Cup players
2000 OFC Nations Cup players
2001 FIFA Confederations Cup players
Soccer players from Adelaide
Australian people of Slovenian descent
Australian people of Italian descent
Sportspeople of Italian descent
National Soccer League (Australia) players
Adelaide United FC managers
A-League Men managers
Singapore Premier League head coaches
K.S.V. Waregem players
Association football midfielders
Lion City Sailors FC head coaches
Australian expatriate soccer players
Expatriate footballers in Belgium
Expatriate footballers in the Netherlands
Expatriate footballers in Spain
Expatriate footballers in Switzerland
Expatriate footballers in Japan
Expatriate footballers in Singapore
Australian expatriate sportspeople in Belgium
Australian expatriate sportspeople in the Netherlands
Australian expatriate sportspeople in Spain
Australian expatriate sportspeople in Switzerland
Australian expatriate sportspeople in Japan
Australian expatriate sportspeople in Singapore